Ubah Chike Sunday (born August 1, 1988) is a Nigerian-born  footballer who currently plays for Shahrdari Yasuj F.C in the Azadegan League.

Club career
Sunday joined Shahin Bushehr F.C. in 2009 before then he played for Foolad F.C., Aluminium Hormozgan F.C. and Iranjavan F.C. all in Iran.

National team
Sunday played for Nigeria national under 17 and under 20 teams respectively.

 Assist Goals

Notes

References
http://www.iranproleague.net/index.php/teams?id=746&view=player&sid=18
http://www.persianleague.com/teams.html?id=746&view=player&sid=18
https://web.archive.org/web/20120427062614/http://rsssf.com/tablesa/afr-u17-05.html

1988 births
Living people
Shahin Bushehr F.C. players
Zagros Yasuj F.C. players
Nigerian footballers
Expatriate footballers in Iran
Iranjavan players
Association football midfielders